This is a list of archdeacons of Cardigan. The Archdeacon of Cardigan is the priest in charge of the archdeaconry of Cardigan, an administrative division of the Church in Wales Diocese of St Davids. The archdeaconry comprises the five deaneries of Cemaes/sub-Aeron, Emlyn, Glyn Aeron, Lampeter/Ultra-Aeron and Llanbadarn Fawr.

Cydifor
?–1148 David fitzGerald (afterwards Bishop of St David's, 1148)
1487-? Thomas ap Hywel
?-1542 John Luntley
?-1547 Hugh Matthew
John Butler held it in 1551 and 1562.
 Edward Talley
 Edward Vaughan 1560-1563
1563 Peregrine Davids
1569-1584 Lewis Gwynn
1592–1629 Richard Middleton
1629-1654 Thomas Brand
1660–1668 Edward Vaughan
1668–1681 William Owen
1681–? John Williams
1701-1714 John Shore
1714-1721 Owen Evans
1721-1727 John Parry
1727-1739 Edward Welchman
1739-1769 Edward Yardley 
1770-1798 Thomas Vincent
1798-1814 John Williams
1814-1833 Thomas Beynon (Archdeacon of Cardigan)
1833-?1858 John Williams (died 1858)
1859-?1860 John Hughes (died 1860)
1860-?1893 William North
1893–1903 James Protheroe
1903–1928 David Williams 
1928–1936 David Williams
1936–1944 David Thomas
1944–1951 Aldred Williams
1951–1962 Richard Ward 
1962–1967 Owen Jenkins (afterwards Archdeacon of Carmarthen, 1967)
1967–1979 Eifion Evans
1979-1982 George Noakes (afterwards Bishop of St David's, 1982)
1982-1986 Sam Jones
1986–1990 Bertie Lewis (afterwards Dean of St David's, 1990)
1990-2006 Hywel Jones
2006-2008 Andy John (afterwards Bishop of Bangor, 2008)
2008–2019 William Strange
1 June 2019present Eileen Davies

Sources

Hardy, Thomas Duffus, ed. (1854), Fasti Ecclesiae Anglicanae 1066–1854, 1, pp. 313, 314, 315

References

External links
Church in Wales page

Cardigan